This is a list of cricketers who played first-class cricket in England in matches between the 1861 and 1870 English cricket seasons. The sport of cricket had acquired most of its modern features by this time and overarm bowling was established as a valid way to deliver the ball beginning in the 1864 season.

The players included are those known to have played in matches which were given retrospective first-class status between 1861 and 1870 inclusive.

A

B

C

D

E

F

G

I
Roger Iddison
William Iddison
Francis Inge
John Inge
Arthur Irvin

J

K

L

M

N

O
Frederick Odams
Christopher Oldfield
John Oliphant
Denzil Onslow
John Oscroft
William Oscroft
Cuthbert Ottaway

P

R

S

T

U
George Ubsdell
Charles Ullathorne

V
P Varley
Rowland Venables
Harry Verelst
John Vince
Stirling Voules
Edmund Vyse

W

Y
William Yardley
Joseph Yates
Charles Young

See also
 List of English cricketers (1772–1786)
 List of English cricketers (1787–1825)
 List of English cricketers (1826–1840)
 List of English cricketers (1841–1850)
 List of English cricketers (1851–1860)

Notes

References

English cricketers 1861